Newala is one of the five districts of the Mtwara Region of Tanzania.  It is bordered to the west by the Masasi District, to the east by the Tandahimba District, to the south by Newala Town, and to the north by the Tandahimba and Masasi Districts. The district is home the Miyuyu Forest Reserve. 

In 2016 the Tanzania National Bureau of Statistics report there were 122,072 people in the ward, from 205,492 in 2012. The decrease due to the creation of the town council in 2014. Most of the inhabitants are from the Makonde tribe.

Administrative areas 
The Newala District is administratively divided into 4 divisions, 22 wards, 107 villages and 302 hamlets.

Wards (2016 population)

 Chihangu (6,064)
 Chilangalanga (6,054)
 Chitekete (4,117)
 Chiwonga (5,564)
 Kitangari (8,150)
 Makukwe (6,637)
 Malatu (6,580)
 Maputi (6,743)
 Mchemo (9,331)
 Mdimba Mpelempele (4,049)
 Mikumbi (4,106)
 Mkoma II (2,976)
 Mkwedu (6,759)
 Mnyambe (7,958)
 Mnyeu (3,020)
 Mpwapwa (3,819)
 Mtopwa (5,882)
 Mtunguru (6,350)
 Muungano (3,812)
 Nakahako (4,733)
 Nambali (6,611)
 Nandwahi (6,575)

References 

Districts of Mtwara Region